Rae Johnson (1953-2020) was a Canadian painter who lived in Toronto, Canada.

Early life 
Originally from Winnipeg, Manitoba, Johnson studied at the New School of Art in Toronto from 1975 to 1976 and at the Ontario College of Art from 1977 to 1980. In 1981 she became a founding member of the ChromaZone gallery, an artist collective dedicated to reintroducing figurative painting to Toronto. In 1987 she moved to Flesherton in northern Ontario; the landscapes which she since produced are reminiscent of the work of the Tom Thomson and the Group of Seven, whose work she had seen at the National Gallery of Canada when she was still a student.

Artwork 
Primarily a painter, Johnson's work dealt with dreams and imagination, providing enough detail to recognize figures and spaces but "encourages us to contemplate endings, meanings and loss." Themes in her artwork ranged from Madonna figures to sexuality, pornography, archetypes and Jungian psychology. With a feminist outlook, and using domestic interiors and natural landscapes as starting points for her paintings, her works have been noted for their diary-like quality, being "like notations in a journal," of simple memories. She painted guardian angels and claimed her favorite angel was Archangel Michael. With her spirituality at the core of her artworks, in her own words, she said: "I want my paintings to offer a space for the imagination and an affirmation of inner life."
In 2020, the Art Gallery of Ontario acquired Johnson's monumental painting Night Games at the Paradise, 1984.

Exhibitions 
Johnson showed extensively throughout Toronto and Canada, including yearly solo exhibitions at the Carmen Lamanna Gallery from 1983-1991. She was represented by Christopher Cutts Gallery in Toronto, which is where she held her last exhibition before her death, entitled Angels and Monsters.

Curating work 
From 2009-2011 she acted as guest curator for the Museum of Contemporary Canadian Art, and National Gallery @ MOCCA, providing research for the 2011 historical exhibition, "This is Paradise,"  where Johnson said: “This exhibition is a celebration of this era, marked by triumph and tragedy, and the reclamation of an important part of Toronto history. Works for this multidisciplinary exhibition have been borrowed from collections across Canada, to once again return to their origins, on Queen Street West.”In 2012, she curated and organized an exhibition of 32 artists from Canada titled TORONTO/BERLIN 1982-2012, hosted by the Zweigstelle Berlin Gallery in Berlin. In 2017, she was selected to be the visual editor of the Theatre Passe Muraille 50th anniversary book, and was recently included in A Concise History of Canadian Painting third edition. She was included in Intervention: 31 Women Painters exhibition in Montreal, curated by Harold Klunder.

Teaching 
Johnson was a professor at OCADU since 1987, and lectured at various institutions, including the Zweigstelle Berlin Gallery, the University of Toronto, York University (Toronto), the Banff Center, University of Guelph, Ontario, and the Toronto School of Art, among others.

Death 
Rae Johnson lived in Toronto until her death on May 18, 2020.

References

1953 births
2020 deaths
Canadian women painters
20th-century Canadian painters
20th-century Canadian women artists
21st-century Canadian painters
21st-century Canadian women artists
OCAD University alumni
Artists from Winnipeg
Neurological disease deaths in Ontario
Deaths from motor neuron disease